István Szentirmay (born 19 July 1949) is a retired Hungarian swimmer who won a bronze medal in the 4 × 100 m medley relay at the 1966 European Aquatics Championships. He competed in seven events at the 1968 and 1972 Summer Olympics; his best achievement was eighth place in the 4 × 100 m medley relay in 1972.

References

1949 births
Living people
Swimmers at the 1968 Summer Olympics
Swimmers at the 1972 Summer Olympics
Olympic swimmers of Hungary
Hungarian male swimmers
Sportspeople from Szeged
European Aquatics Championships medalists in swimming